Isley-Jasper-Isley was a splinter group of the Isley Brothers formed in 1984 by brother-in-law  Chris Jasper (keyboards),  Ernie Isley (lead guitar), and Marvin Isley (bass), due to creative differences that arose among the group.

Jasper, a classically trained musician and composer and the key songwriter, producer, and arranger of Isley Brothers music, became the lead vocalist on most of the trio's recordings, and was also responsible for the majority of the writing and production for the new group. The older Isley Brothers returned to their original vocal trio formation and continued to record, employing a number of musicians, producers, and writers to fill the void left by Chris, Ernie, and Marvin.

Isley/Jasper/Isley released three albums on their CBS Associated Records label, including Caravan of Love, which featured the No. 1 title hit, written and sung by Chris and subsequently covered by English band the Housemartins, who made the song an international No. 1 pop hit. "Caravan of Love" has also been used in the Dodge Caravan commercials, was recorded by Marvin Sapp on the WOW 2000 gospel album, and has become an anthem sung by numerous groups and individuals throughout the world who have made their unique version of the song available on YouTube.

In 1987, Isley/Jasper/Isley disbanded. The Isley-Jasper-Isley half of the group was inducted with the rest of the Isleys in 1992 to the Rock & Roll Hall of Fame and received the Grammy Lifetime Achievement Award in January 2014. At various times, younger brothers Marvin and Ernie Isley returned to perform with older brother Ronald Isley. Marvin Isley died from complications of diabetes in 2010 and Ernie Isley continues to perform with older brother Ronald Isley as The Isley Brothers.

After the break-up of Isley-Jasper-Isley, Jasper continued as a solo artist, multi-instrumentalist and producer, forming his own independent record label, Gold City Records. He has since released 14 solo albums, including four gospel albums. He released two albums on his CBS-Associated label, Gold City Records, including the No. 1 R&B hit "Superbad" in 1988, a song which emphasized the importance of education, a theme Jasper continued to stress in many of the songs he has written on his solo albums. In January 2013, Jasper released Inspired: By Love, By Life, By the Spirit, a compilation of love songs as well as socially conscious and spiritual tracks. In May 2014, Jasper released The One, reminiscent of the soulful R&B and funk music he wrote for the Isleys. In 2016, Jasper released Share With Me, which included a cover of the Billy Preston hit, "You Are So Beautiful" and a special track called "America," a tribute to the nation and a call to come together. In June 2018, Jasper released a double-A single "The Love That You Give/It's a Miracle" from his 15th solo album, Dance With You. Jasper, who earned a law degree in 2004, has continued to write, record, and perform all the music on his solo albums and produce artists for his Gold City label, including Liz Hogue, Out Front, and Brothaz By Choice. The most recent addition to the Gold City label is Jasper's son, Michael Jasper, an up-and-coming songwriter, recording artist and screenplay writer, who earned his law degree in 2018. In 1989, Jasper wrote, produced and performed on "Make It Last" for Chaka Khan's CK album. In 2015, in conjunction with Sony Music, Jasper released the Essential Chris Jasper which encompasses all of the tracks that Jasper sang lead on during his IJI years and solo career at CBS/Sony Music. In 2015, he received the prestigious German Record Critics Lifetime Achievement Award ("Preis der deutschen Schallplattenkritik"). In 2016, Chris was awarded the National R&B Society Lifetime Achievement Award.

Discography

Albums
Broadway's Closer to Sunset Blvd (1984)
Caravan of Love (1985)
Different Drummer (1987)

Compilations
2003: The Best of Isley-Jasper-Isley: Caravan of Love
2010: Broadway's Closer to Sunset Boulevard/Caravan of Love/Different Drummer [double cd]

Singles
1984: "Kiss & Tell" (No. 63 US Pop; No. 52 US R&B, No. 46 US Dance Club Play)
1984: "Look the Other Way" (No. 14 US R&B)
1985: "Caravan of Love" (No. 51 US Pop; No. 1 US R&B; No. 52 UK)
1986: "Insatiable Woman" (No. 13 US R&B; No. 90 UK)
1987: "8th Wonder of the World" (No. 18 US R&B)
1988: "Givin' You Back the Love" (No. 15 US R&B)

Music videos
1984: "Kiss & Tell"
1984: "Look the Other Way"
1985: "Caravan of Love"
1985: "Insatiable Woman"

References

External links
 Official website of Chris Jasper
 Chris Jasper's YouTube channel
 Gold City Records

American soul musical groups
American funk musical groups
American musical trios